Cady is a girl given name and nickname.

Those bearing it include:

Women
 Cady Cantrell (born 1972), Playboy Playmate of the Month for April 1992
 Catherine Coleman (born 1960), American chemist, former United States Air Force officer and former NASA astronaut
 Catherine Cady Huffman (born 1965), American actress
 Cady Groves (1990–2020), American singer-songwriter
 Cady McClain (born 1969), American performer and author
 Cady Noland (born 1956), American artist

Men
 Cady Staley (1840–1928), first president of Case School of Applied Science, now Case Western Reserve University
 Cady Wells (1904–1954), American painter and patron of the arts

Fictional characters
Cady Heron, a character in the movie Mean Girls
Cady, a character in the movie M3gan

See also 
 Kady (given name)
Caddy (name)
 Catie
 Katy (given name)
 Katie
 Cadys, a possibly legendary prince of ancient Lydia
 k.d. lang (born 1961), Canadian musician

Unisex given names
Hypocorisms
Feminine given names
Masculine given names